Kawcze  is a village in Gmina Miastko, Bytów County, Pomeranian Voivodeship, in northern Poland.

From 1975 to 1998 the village was in Słupsk Voivodeship. 

It has a population of 239.

Transport
Kawcze lies along the voivodeship road . In Kawcze there is a PKP railway station.

See also
Kawcze (PKP station)

References

Map of the Gmina Miastko

Kawcze